Ethan Henry Kutler (born May 1, 1995) is an American professional soccer player who plays as a midfielder.

Career

College and amateur
Kutler played college soccer at Colgate University between 2013 and 2016, in the National Premier Soccer League with Greater Binghamton FC, and in the USL Premier Development League with Michigan Bucks.

Professional
Kutler was drafted in the second round (39th overall) of the 2017 MLS SuperDraft by New York Red Bulls. He made his professional debut with the Red Bulls' United Soccer League affiliate New York Red Bulls II on March 25, 2017, starting at right back in a 3–3 draw with Pittsburgh Riverhounds. On October 22, 2017 Kutler scored his first goal as a professional, helping New York to a 4–0 victory over Charleston Battery in the 2017 USL Playoffs.

On May 1, 2018 Kutler signed with New York Red Bulls on a first team contract. Kutler made his first team debut on  June 6, 2018, appearing as a starter in the team's 4–0 derby win over New York City FC in the fourth round of the 2018 Lamar Hunt U.S. Open Cup. On June 13, 2018 Kutler made his first career MLS start, providing two assists in a 2–1 home win over Seattle Sounders FC.  On July 6, 2018 Kutler scored his first goal of the season for New York Red Bulls II in a 6-1 victory over Atlanta United 2.

Kutler was released by the Red Bulls at the end of their 2018 season.

On March 8, 2019, Kutler signed for USL Championship club Pittsburgh Riverhounds SC; he had been on trial for a week with Pittsburgh before signing a one-year contract.

Career statistics

Honors

Club
New York Red Bulls
MLS Supporters' Shield (1): 2018

References

External links
 
 

1995 births
Living people
American soccer players
Association football midfielders
Colgate Raiders men's soccer players
Major League Soccer players
Flint City Bucks players
National Premier Soccer League players
New York Red Bulls draft picks
New York Red Bulls players
New York Red Bulls II players
People from Lansing, New York
Pittsburgh Riverhounds SC players
Soccer players from New York (state)
USL Championship players
USL League Two players